Leshukonskoye Airport is an airport in the selo of Leshukonskoye, Arkhangelsk Oblast, Russia.

Airlines and destinations

Accidents and incidents
On 16 October 1970, Lisunov Li-2 CCCP-84777 of Aeroflot crashed on take-off. The aircraft was overloaded and its centre of gravity was beyond the aft limit.

References

Airports in Arkhangelsk Oblast